"A Different Way" is a song by French DJ and record producer DJ Snake, featuring vocals from American musician Lauv. It was written by Snake, Lindy Robbins, Ilsey Juber, Ed Sheeran, Johnny McDaid and Steve Mac, with production handled by Snake. It was released to digital retailers on 21 September 2017, a day earlier than its expected release date, through Geffen Records.

Background
Snake debuted the song during a Facebook Live video stream on 6 September 2017. He also performed other songs such as "Turn Down for What", "Here Comes the Night" from his 2016 album Encore, and a remix of his Justin Bieber collaboration "Let Me Love You" in the 23-minute mix. It took place on top of Arc de Triomphe, one of the most famous monuments in Paris, Snake's hometown. He announced on social media the previous day that he will be live streaming from an undisclosed location in Paris, with the accompanying hashtag "#ADifferentWay". The stream was directed by Grammy-nominated American director Colin Tilley. Snake later announced the single's release date on Twitter. On 21 September 2017, Snake premiered the song on Zane Lowe's Beats 1 Radio show.

Critical reception
"A Different Way" was well received from music critics. David Rishty of Billboard wrote that the song features "a bouncy melody and punchy backbeat", and that it "carries a similar style to that of 'Let Me Love You'". Jeffrey Yau of Your EDM deemed the song "a mid-tempo ballad that features a furious, futuristic drop which should be radio friendly enough to be a smash while still retaining the energy and atmosphere in a classic Snake main stage banger". Rajrishi Murthi of Bangin Beats felt "the infectious vocal-driven track boasts of all the ingredients to take over airwaves in the coming days". Mike Wass of Idolator opined that the song "doesn't reinvent the wheel", but regarded it as "a no-brainer for pop radio and manages to inject a little emotion into the increasingly soulless club banger".

Charts

Weekly charts

Year-end charts

Certifications

Release history

References

2017 singles
2017 songs
DJ Snake songs
Lauv songs
Songs written by Lindy Robbins
Songs written by Ilsey Juber
Songs written by Ed Sheeran
Songs written by Johnny McDaid
Songs written by Steve Mac
Geffen Records singles
Songs written by DJ Snake